Marshall Harrison Plumlee (born July 14, 1992) is an American former professional basketball player and an active-duty United States Army Ranger-Qualified officer. He played college basketball for the Duke University Blue Devils. He was one of the top-rated basketball recruits in the class of 2011, a McDonald's All-American, and is the younger brother and former high school and college teammate of both Mason and Miles Plumlee.

High school career
A native of Warsaw, Indiana, Plumlee joined his older brothers as boarding students at Christ School in Arden, North Carolina.

During his four years on the basketball team, the Greenies won 139 out of 150 games, winning four consecutive state championships. Plumlee’s contribution to the team increased each year. By his junior year, when both his brothers were playing for Duke, Plumlee averaged 8.6 points, 8.0 rebounds, and 2.6 blocks per game.

As a senior, Plumlee averaged 11.5 points, 10.3 rebounds, and 2.5 blocks per game. Following that season, the 6 ft 11 inch Plumlee was named the Gatorade Player of the Year in North Carolina and named to the 2011 McDonald's All-American Game.

As a senior, Plumlee signed to play for Duke University.
Plumlee’s five-player recruiting class for Duke in 2011 included Austin Rivers, Alex Murphy, Quinn Cook, and Michael Gbinije. Duke's class was the second-best recruiting class in 2011, according to ESPNU.

College career
In Plumlee's freshman year at Duke, both of his brothers were on the team and Marshall redshirted. He made his debut in 2012–13, but his playing time was limited by a stress fracture in his foot. In Plumlee's junior year, he saw limited action, playing 8.5 minutes per game in 30 contests.

By his junior year, Plumlee had developed into a steady inside defender, backing up Jahlil Okafor, a freshman who went on to be the 3rd pick in that year’s NBA draft. That 2015 Duke team won the NCAA national championship.

During his final season at Duke, Plumlee served as a team captain along with Amile Jefferson and Matt Jones. Plumlee started all 36 games that year, averaging 8.3 points, 8.6 rebounds, and 1.6 blocked shots per game.

College statistics

|-
| align="left" | 2012–13
| align="left" | Duke
| 19 || 0 || 2.6 || .125 || 0.0 || 0.0 || 0.6 || 0.1 || 0.2 || 0.2 || 0.1
|-
| align="left" | 2013–14
| align="left" | Duke
| 30 || 0 || 8.5 || .552 || 0.0 || .353 || 2.2 || 0.3 || 0.2 || 0.6 || 1.3
|-
| align="left" | 2014–15
| align="left" | Duke
| 39 || 0 || 9.6 || .762 || 1.00 || .710 || 2.4 || 0.3 || 0.2 || 0.6 || 2.2
|-
| align="left" | 2015–16
| align="left" | Duke
| 36 || 36 || 30.5 || .688 || 0.0 || .575 || 8.6 || 1.1 || 0.8 || 1.6 || 8.3
|-

Professional career

New York Knicks (2016–2017)
After going undrafted in the 2016 NBA draft, Plumlee joined the New York Knicks for the 2016 NBA Summer League. On July 8, 2016, he signed with the Knicks. During his rookie season, he had multiple assignments to the Westchester Knicks of the NBA Development League. Plumlee made his NBA debut on November 20, 2016, against the Atlanta Hawks. He was rushed into the city from his D-League assignment when starting center Joakim Noah was sent home due to illness. He gathered a rebound and committed a foul in five minutes of action in a win over the Hawks. On July 7, 2017, he was waived by the Knicks.

Agua Caliente Clippers (2017–2018)
On September 27, 2017, Plumlee signed with the Los Angeles Clippers. He was waived by the Clippers on October 14, 2017, after appearing in four preseason games. A week later, he was named in the inaugural Agua Caliente Clippers training camp roster. He went on to earn a spot in the team's opening-night roster.

Milwaukee Bucks (2018)
On January 15, 2018, Plumlee signed a two-way contract with the Milwaukee Bucks. Throughout the season, he split his playing time between the Bucks and their NBA G League affiliate, the Wisconsin Herd.

National team career
Plumlee played with the senior United States national team at the 2017 FIBA AmeriCup, where the team won the gold medal.

NBA career statistics

Regular season

|-
| style="text-align:left;"| 
| style="text-align:left;"| New York
| 21 || 1 || 8.1 || .533 || – || .421 || 2.4 || .5 || .2 || .2 || 1.9
|-
| style="text-align:left;"| 
| style="text-align:left;"| Milwaukee
| 8 || 0 || 6.5 || .333 || – || .750 || 2.1 || .3 || .0 || .1 || 1.8
|-
|- class="sortbottom"
| style="text-align:center;" colspan=2| Career
| 29 || 1 || 7.7 || .515 || – || .571 || 2.3 || .4 || .1 || .2 || 1.9

Military career
Plumlee earned a commission into the United States Army as an infantry officer through Duke University's Reserve Officers' Training Corps (ROTC) program. He participated in a ROTC contracting ceremony on January 23, 2015, on the court of Cameron Indoor Stadium. Upon graduating from Duke, Plumlee commissioned into the New York National Guard in 2017, while playing for the New York Knicks.

In 2019, Plumlee graduated from Ranger School, with his mother affixing the Ranger Tab, and transitioned to an active duty military status. According to Plumlee, his inspiration to serve in the military stemmed from his childhood just as his desire to play professional basketball. General Robert Brooks Brown, a retired commanding general of United States Army Pacific, became a mentor of Plumlee's in high school. Both men played collegiate basketball under coach Mike Krzyzewski.

Business career
In May 2022, Plumlee announced that he would be entering the two-year MBA program at Harvard Business School, joining the HBS class of 2024.

Personal life
Plumlee grew up with brothers Miles and Mason, and they reunited during the 2011–12 basketball season at Duke University; they also have a sister named Madeleine, who played volleyball at the University of Notre Dame. They were only the third trio of brothers to play on the same college basketball team at the same time.

His parents are Millard "Perky" (a former Tennessee Tech basketball player) and Leslie Plumlee (a former Purdue women's basketball player who set the school single-game rebound record with 25).  The two met at a basketball camp during the summer of 1979. His grandfather Albert "Bud" Schultz played basketball at Michigan Tech (1944), his uncle William Schultz played basketball at Wisconsin-Eau Claire (1971–72), and his uncle Chad Schultz played basketball at Wisconsin-Oshkosh (1983–86).

References

External links

 Duke profile

1992 births
Living people
Agua Caliente Clippers players
American men's basketball players
Basketball players from Indiana
Centers (basketball)
Christ School (North Carolina) alumni
Duke Blue Devils men's basketball players
McDonald's High School All-Americans
Milwaukee Bucks players
New York Knicks players
People from West Lafayette, Indiana
Undrafted National Basketball Association players
United States men's national basketball team players
Westchester Knicks players
Wisconsin Herd players